The Baltimore Covered Bridge is a wooden covered bridge in Springfield, Vermont, United States.

Description and history
The bridge was originally built in 1870  by Granville Leland and Dennis Allen over Great Brook in North Springfield, Vermont on the road leading to the small town of Baltimore, Vermont. It is a small bridge, only 44 feet long.

The Baltimore Covered Bridge was closed in 1967 due to its poor condition. Former U.S. Senator Ralph E. Flanders headed the committee to restore the bridge. It was restored under the direction of Milton S. Graton, a covered-bridge builder, and moved from North Springfield to a site next to the  Eureka Schoolhouse in 1970. The restored Baltimore Covered Bridge was rededicated in the memory of Senator Flanders and Milton Graton.

See also
List of Vermont covered bridges

References

Buildings and structures in Springfield, Vermont
Bridges completed in 1870
Covered bridges in Vermont
Wooden bridges in Vermont
Bridges in Windsor County, Vermont
Tourist attractions in Windsor County, Vermont
Road bridges in Vermont
Lattice truss bridges in the United States
1870 establishments in Vermont